Tetragonoderus lindemannae is a species of beetle in the family Carabidae. It was described by Jedlicka in 1963.

References

lindemannae
Beetles described in 1963